The Shallows is a 2016 American survival horror film directed by Jaume Collet-Serra, written by Anthony Jaswinski and starring Blake Lively. In the film, a medical student, surfing on vacation, gets stranded  from shore and must use her wits and determination to survive a great white shark attack. Principal photography began in October 2015 in New South Wales and Queensland, Australia.

The film was released in the United States on June 24, 2016, by Columbia Pictures. The film received generally positive reviews and grossed over $119 million against a production budget in the range of $17–25 million, becoming a box office success.

Plot
Shortly after the death of her mother due to cancer, medical student Nancy Adams travels to a secluded beach in Mexico, the same beach her mother visited while she was pregnant with her. Carlos, a friendly local resident, gives Nancy a ride and drops her off at the beach, while a friend of hers who came along with her is staying back at a hotel after partying too much. Nancy joins two other locals and the three surf for several hours. Taking a break from surfing, Nancy video-chats with her younger sister Chloe. When she talks to her father in an emotional and strained conversation, it is revealed that her mother's death caused Nancy to consider dropping out of medical school.

While surfing one last time for the day, Nancy notices the carcass of a young humpback whale nearby. As she rides the last wave back to the beach, a large  great white shark knocks her off her surfboard and bites her leg. Nancy climbs onto the whale carcass, but the shark rams it from underneath, forcing her to swim to an isolated rock. She uses her surfboard leash to slow the bleeding from her leg. Later she uses her jewelry to put rudimentary stitches in place to hold her torn flesh together. Nancy is left alone when the unaware locals leave the beach, and she spends the night on the rock with a wounded gull, which was also injured by the shark, and names him Steven Seagull. The next morning, a drunk local man on the beach steals Nancy's belongings. While wading out into the shallow water to steal Nancy's surfboard, however, he is killed by the shark. Several hours later, the two locals Nancy had surfed with the day before return. They get into the water before Nancy can warn them away, and are also killed by the shark.

One of the local surfers was wearing a GoPro camera on his helmet. When he was attacked by the shark, his helmet had come off and floated to the surface. Nancy later sees the helmet floating in the water. After some struggle, she is able to retrieve it and notices in the footage of the attack, the shark has a large hook stuck in its mouth after a possible encounter with fishermen. Nancy uses the GoPro to leave messages for her sister and father as well as information about the shark attack and her location.

With high tide approaching, Nancy realizes the rock will be submerged soon. After sending Steven Seagull toward shore on a piece of the surfboard, and timing the shark's circles from the whale carcass to the rock, Nancy swims to a nearby buoy, narrowly avoiding the shark by swimming through a group of jellyfish, which sting both the shark and her. Nancy finds a flare gun on the buoy. She shoots one flare to draw the attention of a faraway cargo ship, but the ship has already turned away and does not see her. She then fires another flare at the shark, setting the oil from the whale carcass alight and angering it, but otherwise having no effect. The shark then ferociously attacks the buoy and rips out the chains securing it to the ocean bed. Nancy straps herself to the last remaining chain and as it is ripped from the buoy, she is pulled down to the ocean floor, pursued by the shark. At the last moment, Nancy pulls out of the dive, and the shark impales itself on rebar protruding from the buoy's anchor.

Later, a boy named Miguel (from the opening of the film at the beach) finds the GoPro and informs his father, then revealed to be Carlos. Carlos finds Nancy floating close to shore and revives her. Nancy briefly sees a hallucination of her mother. As she looks around the beach, she sees that Steven Seagull has made a beautiful sculpture of the shore. One year later, a healed Nancy (now a doctor) and her sister Chloe go surfing in Galveston, Texas, as their father tells Nancy that her mother would have been very proud.

Cast

Production
Initially, Louis Leterrier was to direct, though he dropped out in June 2015, leading to Jaume Collet-Serra being considered for the job. Collet-Serra viewed the movie as one about survival and noted "this isn't a creature movie". Likewise from the very beginning Collet-Serra decided not to place an emphasis on gore. Blake Lively joined the cast in August 2015. Lively was partly inspired by her husband Ryan Reynolds's work in the similarly minimalist film Buried, stating "that was one of the reasons why I wanted to take on this movie so much, because I know how tough that was for him and how rewarding it was."

For the seagull character of Steven Seagull, the usage of both CGI and a puppet was considered based on the belief that it would be inordinately hard to train such a bird to act. This "horrified" both producers, Matti Leshem and Lynn Harris, who wanted to work with an actual animal. While scouting for location in Australia, Lively was able to feed a group of seagulls, at which point it was realized that it would be possible to use them for production. The initial script featured Lively talking to the bird much more, and likewise, scenes featuring such an interaction were shot. However, in the end, Collet-Serra decided on a less-is-more approach, noting that "...we didn't want her to be like Snow White talking to animals. When you see her predicament, you get it. You don't need her to explain everything to a seagull!"

Filming
Principal photography on the film began on October 28, 2015 in New South Wales, Australia. Filming also took place at Lord Howe Island, Mount Tamborine, Queensland and Village Roadshow Studios. It originally was going to be filmed on the Gulf Coast of Texas near Galveston, but the filmmakers were denied a film permit for safety reasons. Filming wrapped on January 15, 2016.

Much of the film was shot in a tank using bluescreens for effects. Still, Collet-Serra wanted to avoid the "more stylized look" of similar films using the set up and estimated that 10% of the film was shot on location in order to "trick" the audience into believing the setting was real: he explains: "Every scene has one shot that is real, and the other 99% is not – but the one real shot tricks you". The shark was made entirely through computer-generated imagery, which was only completed close to the start of the marketing campaign for the film. /Film noted that the use of CGI was unusual for Collet-Serra, as he typically used practical effects as opposed to the digital ones required by the shoot. Kelly Richardson was the lead stunt double in all the action scenes in the film, and Isabella Nichols was the lead surf double. Lively ended up performing a few of her own stunts though, including a shot where her character breaks her nose. In reality, Lively really did hurt herself in that scene and the blood on her nose is real.

Release
The Shallows was originally supposed to be released on June 29, 2016, but to avoid The Purge: Election Year and their second weekend being on the holiday of July 4, the film was instead released on Friday, June 24, 2016, by Columbia Pictures.

Box office
The Shallows grossed $55.1 million in North America and $64 million in other territories for a worldwide total of $119.1 million, against a budget of $25 million.

The film opened on June 24, 2016, alongside Independence Day: Resurgence and Free State of Jones, and was projected to gross around $7 million from 2,800 theaters in its opening weekend, with some estimates going as high as $11–12 million. The film grossed $1.3 million from Thursday night previews and $6.8 million on its first day. In its opening weekend, the film grossed $16.7 million, finishing fourth at the box office behind Finding Dory ($73.2 million), Independence Day: Resurgence ($41.6 million) and Central Intelligence ($18.4 million). This was nearly double the expectations of the studio, with Josh Greenstein, Sony president of worldwide marketing and distribution, saying, "We had the best reviewed new movie of the weekend and combined with a great audience response saw a fantastic result. People wanted to watch a film with quality that was original in this summer landscape."

Critical response
The Shallows received generally positive reviews from critics, with Lively's performance being praised. On Rotten Tomatoes, the film has an approval rating of 78% based on 220 reviews with an average rating of 6.50/10. The website's critical consensus reads, "Lean and solidly crafted, The Shallows transcends tired shark-attack tropes with nasty thrills and a powerful performance from Blake Lively." On Metacritic, the film has a score of 59 out of 100 based on 35 critics, indicating "mixed or average reviews". Audiences polled by CinemaScore gave the film an average grade of "B+" on an A+ to F scale.

Richard Roeper of the Chicago Sun-Times, enjoyed the film, calling it an "immensely entertaining millennial B-Movie, made for summertime viewing." Simon Thompson of IGN gave the film a 9/10, noting, "The Shallows does for surfing what The Blair Witch Project did for camping and makes Jaws look like a children's tea party... Terrifyingly good." Matt Zoller Seitz of RogerEbert.com gave the film three stars, commending the performance of Blake Lively while adding "Lively is superb here, giving one of those hyper-focused, action-led performances that's as much an athletic feat as an aesthetic one."

Staci Layne Wilson of Dread Central gave the film a negative review, saying although she wanted to like it, she felt that with "Jaume Collet-Serra's sledgehammer-style direction, Anthony Jaswinski's intelligence-insulting screenplay, and Marco Beltrami's misguided musical score, The Shallows is impossible to endorse." The A.V. Clubs Ignatiy Vishnevetsky, while finding the film intermittently entertaining, considered it a step down from director Collet-Serra's previous "gimmicky genre piece" Non-Stop as well as lacking a genuine, sustained sense of suspense. He also took issue with the writing, stating: "Anthony Jaswinski’s screenplay bogs down this no-brainer survival premise (“get off the rock and don’t die”) with needless backstory and inchoate themes. Can't a heroine just survive a vicious shark attack without also having to overcome a family trauma and make a decision about whether or not she wants to be a doctor?"

Accolades

See also
 List of killer shark films
 Jaws
 Survival film, about the film genre, with a list of related films

References

External links

 
 

2016 films
2016 horror films
2016 thriller drama films
2016 horror thriller films
American drama films
American horror thriller films
American natural horror films
American survival films
Films directed by Jaume Collet-Serra
Films about survivors of seafaring accidents or incidents
Films about sharks
Films set on beaches
Films set on islands
Films set in Mexico
Films set in Texas
Films set in 2016
Films set in 2017
Films about shark attacks
Sea adventure films
Seafaring films
Columbia Pictures films
Films scored by Marco Beltrami
American surfing films
2016 drama films
Films shot at Village Roadshow Studios
2010s survival films
2010s English-language films
2010s American films